The A. J. Casson Award is given to an artist whose work is considered the best submission to the annual "Open Water" competition organized by the Canadian Society of Painters in Water Colour (CSPWC). It is named after Alfred Joseph Casson (1898–1992), painter. and a member of Canada's "Group of Seven". It is officially given "for outstanding achievement in watercolour painting" and is considered Canada's most significant award in this most challenging medium.

"Open Water" is as implied open to any artist working in watercolour. The juried exhibitions have over the years been held in a number of notable exhibition venues including The National Gallery of Canada (Ottawa, Ontario), The Art Gallery of Ontario (Toronto, Ontario), The Beaverbrook Art Gallery (Fredericton, New Brunswick), The University of Alberta [Edmonton], The Art Gallery of Nova Scotia (Halifax), The Art Gallery of Greater Victoria (British Columbia), The Peel Art Gallery, Museum and Archives (Brampton, Ontario) and the John B. Aird Gallery (Toronto, Ontario).
 
The competition has attracted a distinguished series of jurors and entries from not only Canada but from many other countries.

The award consists of a bronze medal created by Dora de Pedery-Hunt which carries an image inspired by one of Casson's most iconic landscapes. The naming of the award in honour of a beloved CSPWC member and the longest surviving founder of the Society was approved by Casson himself shortly before his death. He was actively involved in the selection of the image and in approving the first sculpted maquette.

Accompanied by a cash award the medal was first presented in 1991 when it replaced the CSPWC's Honour Award, a diploma, which had been presented annually from 1956 onwards to the "outstanding watercolour of the year". During a transition period 1991 to 1997 the medal was accompanied by the Honour Award diploma but the latter was phased out in 1998.

Winners

References 

Canadian art awards
Awards established in 1956
1956 establishments in Canada